Compsoctena niphocosma is a moth in the family Eriocottidae. It was described by Edward Meyrick in 1934. It is found in Tanzania.

References

Moths described in 1934
Compsoctena
Lepidoptera of Tanzania